National Route 223 is a national highway of Japan connecting Kobayashi, Miyazaki and Kirishima, Kagoshima in Japan, with a total length of .

See also

References

National highways in Japan
Roads in Kagoshima Prefecture
Roads in Miyazaki Prefecture